Cincloramphus is a genus of birds in the grassbird family Locustellidae.

The genus Cincloramphus was introduced by the English ornithologist and bird artist John Gould in 1838 with the brown songlark as the type species. The name combines the Ancient Greek kinklos meaning "thrush" with rhamphos meaning "bill".

A comprehensive molecular phylogenetic study of the family Locustellidae published in 2018 found that many of the genera were non-monophyletic. In the resulting reorganization the genera Megalurulus and Buettikoferella became junior synonyms of the resurrected genus Cincloramphus.

The genus now contains 12 species:
 Brown songlark (Cincloramphus cruralis)
 Rufous songlark (Cincloramphus mathewsi)
 Rusty thicketbird (Cincloramphus rubiginosus)
 New Britain thicketbird (Cincloramphus grosvenori)
 Buff-banded thicketbird (Cincloramphus bivittatus)
 Papuan grassbird (Cincloramphus macrurus)
 Tawny grassbird (Cincloramphus timoriensis)
 Guadalcanal thicketbird (Cincloramphus turipavae)
 Santo thicketbird (Cincloramphus whitneyi)
 New Caledonian thicketbird (Cincloramphus mariae)
 Long-legged thicketbird (Cincloramphus rufus)
 Bougainville thicketbird (Cincloramphus llaneae)

References

 
Taxa named by John Gould